James S. Nolan (June 9, 1927 – April 19, 1983) was an American professional basketball player. Nolan was selected in the second round of the 1949 BAA Draft by the Philadelphia Warriors. He played for the Warriors for just five games in the 1949–50 NBA season and recorded totals of eight points and four assists. He played college basketball and football at Georgia Institute of Technology. He later returned to Georgia and started a coaching career leading the Tech Freshman Basketball team from 1955 to 1957, then became the Lanier football coach in the early 1960’s. He is a member of Georgia Sports Hall of Fame and the Georgia Tech Athletic Hall of Fame.

References

1927 births
1983 deaths
American men's basketball players
Basketball players from Georgia (U.S. state)
Centers (basketball)
Georgia Tech Yellow Jackets football players
Georgia Tech Yellow Jackets men's basketball players
Philadelphia Warriors draft picks
Philadelphia Warriors players
Sportspeople from Macon, Georgia